Solid-state memory can mean:

 Random access memory using integrated circuits
 Solid-state drive